Callan Moody (born 25 March 1988) is a New Zealand long-distance runner.

He competed in the senior men's race at the 2019 IAAF World Cross Country Championships held in Aarhus, Denmark. He finished in 110th place. In April 2021, he ran his debut marathon in Cheshire, UK. He finished in 02:11:38 making him the 11th fastest New Zealander of all time over this distance.

References

External links 
 

Living people
1988 births
Place of birth missing (living people)
New Zealand male long-distance runners
New Zealand male cross country runners